The 1981-82 Cleveland Cavaliers season was the 12th season of the franchise in the National Basketball Association (NBA). The Cavaliers finished 15-67 (.183) tying the lowest winning percentage in franchise history along with the 1970-71 team.

Key Dates

Offseason

Draft picks

Roster

Regular season

Season standings

Record vs. opponents

Game log

|-style="background:#fcc;"
| 12 || November 24, 1981 || @ Atlanta
| L 92–94 (OT)
|
|
|
| The Omni4,697
| 4–8

|-style="background:#cfc;"
| 19 || December 9, 1981 || Atlanta
| W 112–108 (OT)
|
|
|
| Coliseum at Richfield3,144
| 5–14

|-style="background:#fcc;"
| 31 || January 5, 1982 || @ Atlanta
| L 103–113
|
|
|
| The Omni5,112
| 6–25
|-style="background:#fcc;"
| 40 || January 23, 1982 || Atlanta
| L 99–109
|
|
|
| Coliseum at Richfield4,551
| 7–33

|-style="background:#cfc;"
| 45 || February 6, 1982 || @ Atlanta
| W 88–87
|
|
|
| The Omni10,094
| 11–34

|-style="background:#fcc;"
| 79 || April 13, 1982 || Atlanta
| L 111–119
|
|
|
| Coliseum at Richfield4,245
| 15–64

Player stats

Player Statistics Citation:

Awards and records

Awards

Records

Milestones

All-Star

Transactions

Trades

Free Agents

Development League

References

Cleveland Cavaliers seasons
Cl
Cl;eveland
Cl;eveland